The 2017 Italian Grand Prix (formally known as the Formula 1 Gran Premio Heineken d'Italia 2017) was a Formula One motor race held on 3 September 2017 at the Autodromo Nazionale di Monza in Monza, Italy. It was the thirteenth round of the 2017 FIA Formula One World Championship, and marked the 87th running of the Italian Grand Prix and the 82nd time the race was held at Monza.

Ferrari driver Sebastian Vettel entered the round with a seven-point lead over Lewis Hamilton in the World Drivers' Championship, with Valtteri Bottas forty-one points behind in third. In the World Constructors' Championship, Mercedes led Ferrari by thirty-nine points with Red Bull Racing in third. Hamilton started the race from pole position, the sixty-ninth of his career. With this pole position, he broke Michael Schumacher's record for the most pole positions in a career.

The race concluded with Hamilton leading the championship by 3 points ahead of Vettel.

The grid order for the race was considered somewhat farcical, due to the number of grid penalties that were taken in the race equalling 150 and making the grid almost unrecognisable from the qualifying results. Only 4 drivers started in their qualifying positions, with only Hamilton of the four not having taken a penalty. Sergio Pérez, meanwhile, moved up 1 place on the grid despite having a 5-place grid penalty.

Report

Practice 
Mercedes drivers Lewis Hamilton and Valtteri Bottas set the fastest times in first and second practice respectively, with times of 1:21.537 and 1:21.406.

Third practice was disrupted by heavy rain on the circuit, and the green flag was only shown with 16 minutes remaining. Williams driver Felipe Massa set the quickest time with a 1:40.660.

Qualifying 
The heavy rains that delayed the start of Free Practice 3 remained over the region, causing qualifying to be interrupted. The session started on time, but was red-flagged when Romain Grosjean spun into the barriers. After almost two hours of waiting for the track to clear up, the session resumed with Lewis Hamilton taking pole ahead of the two Red Bulls. Due to grid penalties for both Red Bulls, Lance Stroll was promoted to second, becoming the youngest front row starter in a Formula One race. Esteban Ocon was promoted to third ahead of Bottas, Räikkönen and Vettel.

Race 
The race was welcomed by clear sky with Hamilton on pole ahead of Stroll and Ocon. Hamilton got away well as Stroll was conservative into turn 1 and was passed by Ocon. Further behind there was contact between Massa and Perez. A few laps later, Verstappen moved to the outside at turn 1 but hit Massa which caused Verstappen to get a right front tyre puncture. The stewards took no further action. There were good battles further behind including Räikkönen, Ocon and Stroll. During the only round of pit stops (most drivers made only one stop in the race), all these drivers retained their positions. Further behind, Ricciardo was 5th but overtook Räikkönen into turn 1 and closed in on Vettel. In the end, Mercedes finished with a 1–2, with Lewis Hamilton winning ahead of the second-placed Valtteri Bottas. Vettel finished third ahead of a charging Ricciardo. On the final lap, Massa attacked Stroll but couldn't overtake him and finished 8th. Verstappen recovered from the early puncture to finish 10th after small incidents with the two Haas drivers (Romain Grosjean and Kevin Magnussen).

Classification

Qualifying

Notes
 – Max Verstappen received a 20-place grid penalty for exceeding his quota of power unit components.
 – Daniel Ricciardo received a 25-place grid penalty for exceeding his quota of power unit components and an unscheduled gearbox change.
 – Stoffel Vandoorne received a 25-place grid penalty for exceeding his quota of power unit components.
 – Sergio Pérez received a 5-place grid penalty for an unscheduled gearbox change.
 – Nico Hülkenberg received a 10-place grid penalty for exceeding his quota of power unit components.
 – Fernando Alonso received a 35-place grid penalty for exceeding his quota of power unit components.
 – Carlos Sainz Jr. received a 10-place grid penalty for exceeding his quota of power unit components.
 – Jolyon Palmer received a 15-place grid penalty for exceeding his quota of power unit components.
 – Romain Grosjean failed to set a time within the 107% requirement, but received permission from the stewards to start the race. He also received a 5-place grid penalty for an unscheduled gearbox change.

Race

Notes
 – Fernando Alonso and Marcus Ericsson retired from the race, but were classified as they had completed 90% of the race distance.

Championship standings after the race

Drivers' Championship standings

Constructors' Championship standings

 Note: Only the top five positions are included for both sets of standings.

See also 
 2017 Monza Formula 2 round
 2017 Monza GP3 Series round

References

External links

Italian
Grand Prix
Italian Grand Prix
Italian Grand Prix